Anelosimus potmosbi is a species of spider found in Papua New Guinea.  It is found along the coast near Port Moresby. It is solitary, despite the sociality commonly found in the genus Anelosimus.  The total length of individuals is approximate , and it can be distinguished from other species by the genitalia: the male has an elongated corkscrew embolus, while the female has a simple copulatory duct trajectory.  It is named for the name of Port Moresby in the Tok Pisin language.

References 

Theridiidae
Spiders of Oceania
Spiders described in 2012